The 2011 Baden-Württemberg state election was held on 27 March 2011 to elect the members of the 14th Landtag of Baden-Württemberg. The incumbent coalition government of the Christian Democratic Union and Free Democratic Party led by Minister-President Stefan Mappus lost its majority. The Greens achieved their best result in a state election up to this point at 24%, and became the second largest party in the Landtag. They subsequently formed a coalition with the Social Democratic Party (SPD), and Greens leader Winfried Kretschmann was elected Minister-President. He became the first Green politician to serve as a state head of government in Germany.

Campaign and issues
The Baden-Württemberg election was considered to have significant ramifications for Chancellor Angela Merkel; the state had been a CDU stronghold for almost 60 years.

Stuttgart 21
Stuttgart 21 was a major election issue. Work for this project, that sets out to transform the Stuttgart Main Station from a terminus station into a subterranean non-terminus station, was started in the summer of 2010 despite massive protests by the Stuttgart population. The main reasons for the protests are the questionable necessity of the transformation, i.e. the disproportionate costs (between 4 and 5 billion Euros) in relation to the (small) gains in travel time (the current station is a functioning station with 90% of the passengers ending their journey here anyway), the dismantling and partial destruction of the old station building (generally considered to be cultural heritage), the destruction of some of the inner-city's park ("Schlossgarten"), the geological risks posed by the tunnels that would have to be drilled into the Stuttgart ground, endangering Europe's second largest mineral water sources and spas, and the danger of some of the buildings above the tunnels collapsing.

Transparent government became an issue due to the controversy about Stuttgart 21.

The CDU government of Stefan Mappus supported of the project. The government opposed demonstrations and civil disobedience campaigns against the project, which were broken up by force, with police using tear gas and water cannons on protestors. Mappus was considered to have linked his political fate to the success or failure of the project.

The SPD leadership also supported Stuttgart 21, but since early 2010 called for a referendum on the issue "to pacify the city" and end the ongoing protests. The party did not take a clear stance on the issue due to opposition of the project from much of its membership.

Opposition to Stuttgart 21 led to "unprecedented popularity" for the Alliance 90/The Greens in Baden-Württemberg and a major rise in the polls.

As a coalition partner of the CDU in the Mappus government, the FDP also supported Stuttgart 21. The party was criticized for its acceptance of the violent force used against demonstrators in the late summer of 2010.

Nuclear power
Following the Fukushima Daiichi nuclear disaster, Chancellor Angela Merkel announced the temporary shutdown of Germany's seven nuclear power stations built before 1980. She also stated that she was committed to total withdrawal from nuclear power sooner than the revisited nuclear exit plan dates.

Parties
The table below lists parties represented in the previous Landtag of Baden-Württemberg.

Opinion polling

Results

|-
|colspan="8" | 
|-
! colspan="2" | Party
! Votes
! %
! +/-
! Seats 
! +/-
! Seats %
|-
| bgcolor=| 
| align=left | Christian Democratic Union (CDU)
| align=right| 1,943,912
| align=right| 39.0
| align=right| 5.2
| align=right| 60
| align=right| 9
| align=right| 43.5
|-
| bgcolor=| 
| align=left | Alliance 90/The Greens (Grüne)
| align=right| 1,206,182
| align=right| 24.2
| align=right| 12.5
| align=right| 36
| align=right| 19
| align=right| 26.1
|-
| bgcolor=| 
| align=left | Social Democratic Party (SPD)
| align=right| 1,152,594
| align=right| 23.1
| align=right| 2.1
| align=right| 35
| align=right| 3
| align=right| 25.4
|-
| bgcolor=| 
| align=left | Free Democratic Party (FDP)
| align=right| 262,784
| align=right| 5.3
| align=right| 5.4
| align=right| 7
| align=right| 8
| align=right| 5.1
|-
! colspan=8|
|-
| bgcolor=| 
| align=left | The Left (Linke)
| align=right| 139,700
| align=right| 2.8
| align=right| 0.3
| align=right| 0
| align=right| ±0
| align=right| 0
|-
| bgcolor=| 
| align=left | Pirate Party Germany (Piraten)
| align=right| 103,618
| align=right| 2.1
| align=right| New
| align=right| 0
| align=right| New
| align=right| 0
|-
| bgcolor=| 
| align=left | The Republicans (REP)
| align=right| 56,723
| align=right| 1.1
| align=right| 1.4
| align=right| 0
| align=right| ±0
| align=right| 0
|-
| bgcolor=|
| align=left | Others
| align=right| 118,206
| align=right| 2.4
| align=right| 0.2
| align=right| 0
| align=right| ±0
| align=right| 0
|-
! align=right colspan=2| Total
! align=right| 4,983,719
! align=right| 100.0
! align=right| 
! align=right| 138
! align=right| 1
! align=right| 
|-
! align=right colspan=2| Voter turnout
! align=right| 
! align=right| 66.2
! align=right| 12.8
! align=right| 
! align=right| 
! align=right| 
|}

Post-election
After the loss, outgoing Minister-President Stefan Mappus announced his resignation as chairman of the Christian Democratic Union in Baden-Württemberg. Federal Social Democratic Party leader Frank-Walter Steinmeier insisted that Chancellor Angela Merkel should call for new elections after the defeat of the Christian Democratic Union in Baden-Württemberg.

On 27 April 2011, the Greens and the Social Democratic Party announced that they had finalized their coalition agreement. Winfried Kretschmann and Social Democratic Party leader Nils Schmid presented an 83-page document titled The Change Begins. The only minister named was Nils Schmid, who became Deputy Minister-President and "super-minister" for finance and the economy. Other than Schmid, the coalition announced which parties were to receive each ministry, but did not name appointees. The Social Democrats acquired the majority of the ministerial positions, but the Greens had a majority in the cabinet. The Greens obtained the ministries of the environment, transportation, science, rural areas, consumer protection and a ministry for civil society. The Social Democrats got the ministries of the economy, finance, justice, labour, schools, welfare, and the interior. As part of the coalition agreement, the red-green alliance agreed to organize a referendum regarding Stuttgart 21. They also agreed on "radical changes" to the education system and transport policy, and to accelerate the phasing out of nuclear power. Hermann Gröhe, the secretary general of the CDU, "condemned" the coalition agreement.

On 12 May 2011, Winfried Kretschmann was sworn in as Minister-President of Baden-Württemberg. Kretschmann became the first Minister-President in Germany from the Greens. In the Landtag vote for Minister-President, Kretschmann received at least two votes from the opposition.

Notes

References

External links
 Baden-Württemberg Statistical Office

2011 elections in Germany
2011